The Curtiss XP-10 was an American experimental biplane fighter developed by Curtiss and tested by the United States Army Air Corps, but rejected due to disappointing performance and major problems with the cooling system.

Design and development
Ordered on 18 June 1928, it was intended to be fast and maneuverable enough to win a dogfight. The XP-10 used a gull wing top wing, joined at the fuselage; this offered much better pilot visibility than the traditional biplane configuration. Coincidentally, this also permitted the wing and fuselage to meet at the optimum angle for minimizing drag. The wings were plywood-covered (rather than doped fabric, as used in World War I), and the fuselage was fabric-covered steel tubing.

The XP-10 used a 600 hp (447 kW) Curtiss V-1570-15 Conqueror water-cooled V12 engine. To overcome the drag of a radiator (a quite serious issue before the introduction of ethylene glycol), Curtiss incorporated it into the upper wing. It was formed of corrugated brass sheets through which cooling water was run. While ingenious, this introduced technical and mechanical problems, especially vulnerability to enemy fire in a combat aircraft.

Operational history
Delivered to the Army Air Corps in August 1928, the XP-10 first flew in September.  Despite excellent manoeuvrability, with the XP-10 proving superior to the Curtiss Hawk in testing, persistent problems with cooling and the plumbing of the surface radiator led to the XP-10 being abandoned.

Operators

United States Army Air Corps

Specifications (XP-10)

References

Bibliography

 Dorr, Robert F. and David Donald. Fighters of the United States Air Force. London: Temple, 1990. .
 Green, William. War Planes of the Second World War, Fighters. Volume Four. Garden City, NY: Doubleday & Company, 1973.
 Jones, Lloyd S. U.S. Fighters: 1925-1980s. Fallbrook, California: Aero Publishers, Inc., 1975. .

P-10
Curtiss P-10
Single-engined tractor aircraft
Biplanes
Aircraft first flown in 1928